Udupi Shri Krishna Temple is a well-known historic Hindu temple dedicated to Lord Krishna and Dvaita Matha located in the city of Udupi in Karnataka, India. The Matha area resembles a living Aashram, a holy place for daily devotion and living. Surrounding the Shri Krishna Temple are several temples namely the Udupi Anantheshwara Temple which is over a thousand years old.

History

The Krishna Matha was founded by the Vaishnavite saint Jagadguru Shri Madhvacharya in the 13th century. He was the founder of the Dwaita school of Vedanta. It is believed that Madhwacharya found the vigraha of Shri Krishna in a large ball of gopichandana. As told by Sri Madhvacharya, in his Tantrasara Sangraha, the Vigraha is placed Pashchimabhimukha (facing west). All the other Vigrahas in other Ashta Muthas face west as well. Devotees always have darshan of Lord Krishna through the inner window, known as the Navagruha Kindi & the outer window known as the Kanakana Kindi, which is decorated by an arch named after the great saint Kanakadasa. A statue has also been erected. A similar window covers the immediate front of the Vigraha and is called Navagraha Kindi. It is often mistaken to be the Kanakuna Kindi.

The temple opens at 5:30 hours IST. The unique feature of the temple is that the deity is worshipped through a silver-plated window with nine holes (Navagraha Kindi). The temple also offers prasadam (lunch) at noon and is popularly called Anna Brahma as it feeds a vast number of devotees.

Krishna Matha
The daily sevas (offerings to god) and administration of the Krishna Mathas is managed by the Ashta Mathas (eight monasteries). Each of the Ashta Mathas performs temple management activities for two years in a cyclical order. They are collectively known as the Ashta Mathagalu in Kannada. Each Ashta Matha has its own deity which is called Pattada Devaru.

The Krishna Matha is known throughout the world for its religious customs, traditions and tenets of Dvaita or Tatvavada philosophy. It is also the center of Daasa Saahitya, a form of literature that originated in Udupi.

These eight Mathas are:
 Pejavara,
 Puttige,
 Palimaru Matha,
 Admaru Matha,
 Sodhe Matha,
 Kaniyoor Matha,
 Shirur Matha and
 Krishnapura.Matha

The expenses of Udupi Krishna Matha are borne by the voluntary contributions of the devotees and by the Ashta Mathas that manage the Krishna Matha. The contribution may be in cash or kind. The Krishna Matha, which owned large tracts of land, lost it all in 1975 due to the enactment of the Land Reforms Act 1975 by the Government of Karnataka.

The Pauli of Krishna Matha was renovated and the Brahmakalashotsava ceremony was held on 18 May 2017.

Swamijis of the Ashta Mathas 
The Swamijis of the Ashta Mathas and their successors are as follows.

Festivals

During the Paryaya festival, held once every two years, the temple management is handed over to the next Ashta Matha, which has been entrusted the responsibility of running the temple turn by turn. Each of the Mathas is headed by a Swami, who will be in charge of the temple during his Paryaya. The Paryaya is held on even years like 2008, 2010 and 2012. The Paryaya tradition has completed 500 years as of 2021. Presently, Sri Admaru Math is administering the temple with Junior Pontiff Sri Eshapriya Teertha Swami ascending the post of Sarvajna or Paryaya Peetha. Festivals like Makara Sankranthi, Ratha Sapthami, Madhva Navami, Hanuman Jayanthi, Sri Krishna Janmashtami, Navarathi Mahotsava, Madhva Jayanti (Vijaya Dashami), Naraka Chathurdashi, Deepavali, Geetha Jayanthi etc. are celebrated very grandly by Paryaya Mutt every year.

Gallery

References

External links

Sri Krishna Temple, Udupi
Temples in Udupi
Udupi Shri Krishna photos
Udupi Shri Krishna Temple and related information guide

Krishna temples
Hindu temples in Udupi district
Madhva mathas
Haridasa
Forms of Krishna
Abhimana temples of Vishnu